The 1922 Waldeck state election was held on 21 May 1922 to elect the 17 Landesvertreter (State Representatives) of the Free State of Waldeck.

Results

References 

1922 elections in Germany
1922